N-Formylpiperidine is an organic compound with the formula C6H11NO. It is the amide of formic acid and piperidine. It can be used as a polar aprotic solvent, with better hydrocarbon solubility than other amide solvents such as dimethylformamide (DMF). It has also been used to transfer the formyl group to a Grignard reagent:

 PhCH2CH2MgCl + C6H11NO → PhCH2CH2CHO

In some formylation reaction of alkyllithium compounds, N-formylpiperidine gives higher yields than the DMF.

References

1-Piperidinyl compounds
Formamides